Giuseppe Nazzani (born 27 June 1990) is a former Italian American professional football (soccer) player who played in the third and fourth tiers of football in Italy.

Career
Nazzani made his senior football debut during the 2009–10 season by going on loan with Lega Pro Prima Divisione club Figline and then Lega Pro Seconda Divisione club Bellaria Igea.  The following season, he went on loan again, this time with Gubbio.

In January 2012 he was signed by Ebolitana. Nazzani left for Giacomense on 12 July 2012. On 30 June 2013 Bologna terminated the contract with Nazzani in a mutual consent.

International
Nazzani grew up in Italy but holds an American passport.  In 2008, Thomas Rongen called him into a camp with the US under-20 team. Ultimately, Nazzani was not selected for the US team for the 2009 U-20 World Cup.

References

External links
 AIC profile (data by football.it) 
 

American soccer players
Italian footballers
Association football forwards
Bologna F.C. 1909 players
A.C. Bellaria Igea Marina players
Serie C players
1990 births
Living people